Elections to Craigavon Borough Council were held on 19 May 1993, on the same day as the other Northern Irish local government elections. The election used four district electoral areas to elect a total of 26 councillors.

Election results

Note: "Votes" are the first preference votes.

Districts summary

|- class="unsortable" align="centre"
!rowspan=2 align="left"|Ward
! % 
!Cllrs
! % 
!Cllrs
! %
!Cllrs
! %
!Cllrs
! % 
!Cllrs
! %
!Cllrs
! %
!Cllrs
!rowspan=2|TotalCllrs
|- class="unsortable" align="center"
!colspan=2 bgcolor="" | UUP
!colspan=2 bgcolor="" | SDLP
!colspan=2 bgcolor="" | DUP
!colspan=2 bgcolor="" | Sinn Féin
!colspan=2 bgcolor="" | Alliance
!colspan=2 bgcolor="" | Workers' Party
!colspan=2 bgcolor="white"| Others
|-
|align="left"|Craigavon Central
|bgcolor="40BFF5"|42.6
|bgcolor="40BFF5"|3
|19.5
|1
|15.2
|1
|11.2
|1
|7.8
|1
|3.7
|0
|0.0
|0
|7
|-
|align="left"|Loughside
|9.8
|0
|bgcolor="#99FF66"|62.1
|bgcolor="#99FF66"|3
|2.3
|0
|21.9
|1
|0.0
|0
|3.9
|1
|0.0
|0
|5
|-
|align="left"|Lurgan
|bgcolor="40BFF5"|60.0
|bgcolor="40BFF5"|5
|9.2
|1
|20.6
|1
|0.0
|0
|7.5
|0
|0.0
|0
|2.7
|0
|7
|-
|align="left"|Portadown
|bgcolor="40BFF5"|43.8
|bgcolor="40BFF5"|3
|18.4
|1
|22.8
|2
|8.0
|0
|7.0
|1
|0.0
|0
|0.0
|0
|7
|- class="unsortable" class="sortbottom" style="background:#C9C9C9"
|align="left"| Total
|41.1
|11
|24.9
|6
|16.1
|4
|9.2
|2
|6.2
|2
|1.8
|1
|0.7
|0
|26
|-
|}

District results

Craigavon Central

1989: 4 x UUP, 1 x SDLP, 1 x DUP, 1 x Alliance
1993: 3 x UUP, 1 x SDLP, 1 x DUP, 1 x Sinn Féin, 1 x Alliance
1989-1993 Change: Sinn Féin gain from UUP

Loughside

1989: 3 x SDLP, 1 x Sinn Féin, 1 x Workers' Party
1993: 3 x SDLP, 1 x Sinn Féin, 1 x Workers' Party
1989-1993 Change: No change

Lurgan

1989: 4 x UUP, 2 x DUP, 1 x SDLP
1993: 5 x UUP, 1 x DUP, 1 x SDLP
1989-1993 Change: UUP gain from DUP

Portadown

1989: 4 x UUP, 1 x DUP, 1 x SDLP, 1 x Alliance
1993: 3 x UUP, 2 x DUP, 1 x SDLP, 1 x Alliance
1989-1993 Change: DUP gain from UUP

References

Craigavon Borough Council elections
Craigavon